Propellerheads were an English electronic music duo, formed in 1995 in Bath and consisting of Will White and Alex Gifford.

History
Their first release was an EP named Dive!, released in 1996 through the independent label Wall of Sound. They gained fame the next year by providing a remix for James Bond movie composer David Arnold's Bond tribute album Shaken & Stirred: The David Arnold James Bond Project covering John Barry's "On Her Majesty's Secret Service", the theme song to the sixth James Bond film, re-orchestrated by Arnold. They also collaborated with Arnold on the track "Backseat Driver" for the soundtrack of the Bond film Tomorrow Never Dies. The single "History Repeating" followed, a collaboration with Shirley Bassey (also well known for her James Bond music), fusing big beat with jazz. "History Repeating" was used as the theme for So Graham Norton and was also featured in the Farrelly Brothers' film There's Something About Mary.

The Propellerheads album Decksandrumsandrockandroll was released in 1998 by Wall of Sound in Europe and DreamWorks in the US and Japan. The DreamWorks versions include collaborations with hip hop artists De La Soul and Jungle Brothers, and the Japanese version is a two disc special edition including some of their earlier singles. A track from the album, "Spybreak!", became widely known after its use in the lobby scene in the 1999 feature film The Matrix. They are also noted for providing "Crash" (a remixed cover version of Brass Incorporated's "At the Sign of the Swinging Cymbal", perhaps best known as the theme song of BBC Radio 1's Pick of the Pops) as the theme tune to Radio 1's 'Official Chart Show' between 1998 and 2002, when Mark Goodier was the host. This song was also used in the 1999 hit comedy film Austin Powers: The Spy Who Shagged Me.

After touring for their hit album, White fell ill. They released Extended Play EP in 1998, and in the song "Props' Vote of Gratitude", Alex Gifford raps for the first time, explaining to the listener that the band would "be back after this short break". Gifford moved to New York and produced the Jungle Brothers' 1999 album V.I.P., in which he raps with The Black Eyed Peas among others. White provided the drums for the eponymous track. He has also produced "Shadows", a track for Rufus Wainwright on his 2001 album Poses. White has since released a mix compilation for the Beatz and Bobz series, and he has also appeared as a member of the De-Fex music project.

In November 1998, the song "Bang On!" was included in the Nintendo 64 video game Wipeout 64. Earlier that same year, the same song was also featured on the Lost in Space soundtrack. Another song "Lethal Cut" was featured in the PlayStation game Wipeout 3, while "Big Dog" was featured in the background music of the PAL version of Gran Turismo 2.

Following their 1997 collaboration, in 2000 Propellerheads again worked with Shirley Bassey, this time remixing her 1964 song, "Goldfinger". This version was included on Bassey's remix album, Diamonds Are Forever.

In 2001, the band recorded "Star Crossed Lovers" with Martha Wainwright for the Red Hot Organization's compilation album Red Hot + Indigo, a tribute to Duke Ellington, which raised money for various charities devoted to increasing AIDS awareness and fighting the disease.

"Take California" was selected by Apple for their iPod debut commercial that year. It features a man shaking his head while listening to the track on his Mac, then drags the song onto the device including his "Favorites" playlist. He puts on his earbuds dancing to the song then leaves. It ends with the iPod wordmark and "Think different" slogan showing up.

In October 2003, Wall of Sound commemorated its tenth birthday. To commemorate the occasion, the label released a two disc album charting ten years of its pioneering British music. The first CD featured Röyksopp, The Wiseguys and Mekon, while Gifford provided a mix CD for the second disc. The first track on that disc, "Ten Years (Johnston's Strut, Part 1)", was a new song by Propellerheads featuring the Brooklyn-based writer Livingroom Johnston.

One of the trailers for the Disney/Pixar film The Incredibles featured "On Her Majesty's Secret Service".

Their version of "On Her Majesty's Secret Service" featured as a choice of Horizon presenter Kevin Fong on Desert Island Discs, as this was the track he played every morning when driving to the Kennedy Space Center while working with NASA.

White was part of the live incarnation of Long Range, the now defunct project of Phil Hartnoll of Orbital.

Prior to Propellerheads' formation, Alex Gifford played as a backing saxophonist for The Stranglers appearing on the albums Dreamtime (1986) and 10 (1990) as well as the live album All Live and All of the Night (1988).

Discography

Studio album

EPs

Singles

Other singles
808 State's song "Lopez" (featuring vocals from James Dean Bradfield) was remixed by Propellerheads with the subtitle "Hard-On Mix". This remix was released as a promotional single in 1996 credited to "808state via The Propellerheads". Upon the commercial release of the single in 1997, the Hard on Mix became a B-side, with the original version as the A-side.

References

Further reading

English electronic music duos
Big beat groups
Musical groups established in 1995
Musical groups disestablished in 2003
Musical groups from Somerset